Péter Mihalecz (born 6 June 1979 in Zalaegerszeg) is a Hungarian professional footballer who plays for FC Ajka.

Club statistics

Updated to games played as of 1 June 2014.

References
MLSZ 
HLSZ 

1979 births
Living people
People from Zalaegerszeg
Hungarian footballers
Association football forwards
Hévíz FC footballers
Büki TK Bükfürdő footballers
Szombathelyi Haladás footballers
Pécsi MFC players
FC Ajka players
Nemzeti Bajnokság I players
Sportspeople from Zala County